Kosmikud are an Estonian alternative rock group founded in 1999. They released their first album Ei roosid in 2000, after their singer Taavi Pedriks died. The remaining three members of the band – Aleksander Vana (guitar), Kristo Rajasaare (drums) and Kõmmari (bass) – decided to take a time out, rehearse and try new singers. They finally chose Meelis Hainsoo (Hainz), violinist in Eriti Kurva Muusika Ansambel ('Ensemble of Especially Sad Music') and also a friend of their previous singer.

Their second album Kuidas tuli pimedus... ('How Darkness Came...'), which was released in 2003, includes songs that talk about love, death, depression, etc. Their biggest influences have been Joy Division, Nick Cave, and Кино.

In 2004 they did an album with Estonian industrial metal band No-Big-Silence called Kuidas kuningas kuu peale kippus.
In 2006 they released Pulmad ja matused ('Weddings and Funerals') and in 2008 Ainus, mis jääb, on beat ('Only Beat Endures').

On 18 July 2018, Raivo Rätte was killed when he was hit by a car apparently driven by his former wife's new partner. Criminal investigation is ongoing.

Line-up

Original line-up (1999–2000)
 Taavi Pedriks (1971–2000) – vocals
 Andres alias Aleksander Vana – guitar
 Raivo "Kõmmari" Rätte – bass (died 18 July 2018)
 Kristo Rajasaare – drums

Second line-up (2001–present)
 Meelis "Hainz" Hainsoo – vocals
 Andres alias Aleksander Vana – guitar
 Raivo "Kõmmari" Rätte – bass (died 18 July 2018)
 Kristo Rajasaare – drums

Discography
 Ei roosid (2000)
 Kuidas tuli pimedus... (2003)
 Kuidas kuningas kuu peale kippus (2004), with No-Big-Silence
 Pulmad ja matused (2006)
 Ainus, mis jääb, on beat (2008)
 Öö ei lase magada (2011)
 Sügis sanatooriumis (2017)

External links

 

Entry at Estmusic.com

References

Estonian alternative rock groups
Musical groups established in 1999
1999 establishments in Estonia